Amawaka (The Invisible Moon) is an upcoming Sri Lankan Sinhala drama film directed by Vijitha Gunaratne and produced by Upul Jayasinghe for Nilwala Films. It stars Shyam Fernando and Suranga Ranawana in lead roles along with Duleeka Marapana and Samson Siripala.

Plot

Cast
 Duleeka Marapana 
 Shyam Fernando
 Suranga Ranawaka

References

External links
 
 Gajaman on YouTube

Sinhala-language films
Sri Lankan drama films